The Harrison Narcotics Tax Act (Ch. 1) was a United States federal law that regulated and taxed the production, importation, and distribution of opiates and coca products. The act was proposed by Representative Francis Burton Harrison of New York and was approved on December 17, 1914.

"An Act To provide for the registration of, with collectors of internal revenue, and to impose a special tax on all persons who produce, import, manufacture, compound, deal in, dispense, sell, distribute, or give away opium or coca leaves, their salts, derivatives, or preparations, and for other purposes." The courts interpreted this to mean that physicians could prescribe narcotics to patients in the course of normal treatment, but not for the treatment of addiction.

The Harrison Anti-Narcotic legislation consisted of three U.S. House bills imposing restrictions on the availability and consumption of the psychoactive drug opium. U.S. House bills  and  passed conjointly with House bill  or the Opium and Coca Leaves Trade Restrictions Act.

Although technically illegal for purposes of distribution and use, the distribution, sale and use of cocaine was still legal for registered companies and individuals.

History

International background 
Following the Spanish–American War and the Philippine–American War, the Philippines saw a proliferation of opium use. A cholera outbreak in 1902 further strengthened this tendency due to the astringent properties of opium.

Charles Henry Brent was an American Episcopal bishop who served as Missionary Bishop of the Philippines beginning in 1901. He convened a Commission of Inquiry, known as the Brent Commission, for the purpose of examining alternatives to a licensing system for opium addicts. Although Governor William Taft supported this policy, Brent opposed it "on moral grounds". The Commission recommended that narcotics should be subject to international control. The recommendations of the Brent Commission were endorsed by the United States Department of State and in 1906 President Theodore Roosevelt called for an international conference, the International Opium Commission, which was held in Shanghai in February 1909. A second conference was held at The Hague in May 1911, and out of it came the first international drug control treaty, the International Opium Convention of 1912.

Domestic background 
In the 1800s, opiates and cocaine were mostly unregulated drugs. In the 1890s, the Sears & Roebuck catalogue, which was distributed to millions of Americans homes, offered a syringe and a small amount of cocaine for $1.50.  On the other hand, as early as 1880, some states and localities had already passed laws against smoking opium, at least in public, for example as reported in the Los Angeles Herald in an article mentioning the city law against opium smoking.

At the beginning of the 20th century, cocaine began to be linked to crime. In 1900, the Journal of the American Medical Association published an editorial stating, "Negroes in the South are reported as being addicted to a new form of vice – that of 'cocaine sniffing' or the 'coke habit.'"  Some newspapers later claimed cocaine use caused blacks to rape white women and was improving their pistol marksmanship. Chinese immigrants were blamed for importing the opium-smoking habit to the U.S. The 1903 blue-ribbon citizens' panel, the Committee on the Acquirement of the Drug Habit, concluded, "If the Chinaman cannot get along without his dope we can get along without him."

Opium 
Theodore Roosevelt appointed Dr. Hamilton Wright as the first Opium Commissioner of the United States in 1908. In 1909, Wright attended the International Opium Commission in Shanghai as the American delegate. He was accompanied by Charles Henry Brent, the Episcopal Bishop. On March 12, 1911, Wright was quoted in an article in The New York Times: "Of all the nations of the world, the United States consumes most habit-forming drugs per capita. Opium, the most pernicious drug known to humanity, is surrounded, in this country, with far fewer safeguards than any other nation in Europe fences it with." He further claimed that "it has been authoritatively stated that cocaine is often the direct incentive to the crime of rape by the negroes of the South and other sections of the country". He also stated that "one of the most unfortunate phases of smoking opium in this country is the large number of women who have become involved and were living as common-law wives or cohabitating with Chinese in the Chinatowns of our various cities".

Opium usage had begun to decline by 1914 after rising dramatically in the post Civil War Era, peaking at around one-half million pounds per year in 1896.   Demand gradually declined thereafter in response to mounting public concern, local and state regulations, and the Pure Food and Drugs Act of 1906, which required labeling of patent medicines that contained opiates, cocaine, alcohol, cannabis and other intoxicants. As of 1911, an estimated one U.S. citizen in 400 (0.25%) was addicted to some form of opium.  The opium addicts were mostly women who were prescribed and dispensed legal opiates by physicians and pharmacist for "female problems" (probably pain at menstruation) or white men and Chinese at the Opium dens. Between two-thirds and three-quarters of these addicts were women. By 1914, forty-six states had regulations on cocaine and twenty-nine states had laws against opium, morphine, and heroin.

The committee report prior to the debate on the house floor and the debate itself, discussed the rise of opiate use in the United States.  Harrison stated that "The purpose of this Bill can hardly be said to raise revenue, because it prohibits the importation of something upon which we have hitherto collected revenue." Later Harrison stated, "We are not attempting to collect revenue, but regulate commerce."   House representative Thomas Sisson stated, "The purpose of this bill—and we are all in sympathy with it—is to prevent the use of opium in the United States, destructive as it is to human happiness and human life."

The drafters played on fears of "drug-crazed, sex-mad negroes" and made references to Negroes under the influence of drugs murdering whites, degenerate Mexicans smoking marijuana, and "Chinamen" seducing white women with drugs. Dr. Hamilton Wright, testified at a hearing for the Harrison Act. Wright alleged that drugs made blacks uncontrollable, gave them superhuman powers and caused them to rebel against white authority. Dr. Christopher Koch of the State Pharmacy Board of Pennsylvania testified that "Most of the attacks upon the white women of the South are the direct result of a cocaine-crazed Negro brain".

Before the Act was passed, on February 8, 1914, The New York Times published an article entitled "Negro Cocaine 'Fiends' Are New Southern Menace: Murder and Insanity Increasing Among Lower-Class Blacks" by Edward Huntington Williams, which reported that Southern sheriffs had increased the caliber of their weapons from .32 to .38 to bring down Negroes under the effect of cocaine.

Despite the extreme racialization of the issue that took place in the buildup to the Act's passage, the contemporary research on the subject indicated that black Americans were using cocaine and opium at much lower rates than white Americans.

Effect 

Enforcement began in 1915.

The act appears to be mainly concerned about the marketing of opiates. However, a clause applying to doctors allowed distribution "in the course of his professional practice only." This clause was interpreted after 1917 to mean that a doctor could not prescribe opiates to an addict. A number of doctors were arrested and some were imprisoned. The medical profession quickly learned not to supply opiates to addicts. In United States v. Doremus, 249 U.S. 86 (1919), the Supreme Court ruled that the Harrison Act was constitutional, and in Webb v. United States, 249 U.S. 96, 99 (1919) that physicians could not prescribe narcotics solely for maintenance.

The impact of diminished supply was obvious by mid-1915. A 1918 commission called for sterner law enforcement, while newspapers published sensational articles about addiction-related crime waves. Congress responded by tightening up the Harrison Act—the importation of heroin for any purpose was banned in 1924.

The use of the term 'narcotic', which was originally derived from ancient Greek ναρκῶ (narkō), "to make numb", in the title of the act referenced not just opiates but also cocaine, which is a central nervous system stimulant. This set a precedent of frequent legislative and judicial misclassification of various (illegal) substances as 'narcotics'. Today, law enforcement agencies, popular media, the United Nations, other nations and even some medical practitioners can be observed applying the term very broadly and often pejoratively in reference to a wide range of illicit substances, regardless of the more precise definition existing in medical contexts. For this reason, however, 'narcotic' has come to mean any illegally used drug, but it is useful as a shorthand for referring to a controlled drug in a context where its legal status is more important than its physiological effects.

One effect of this act, which has largely been superseded by the Controlled Substances Act of 1970, is the warning "*Warning: May be habit forming" on labels, package inserts, and other places where ingredients are listed in the case of many opioids, barbiturates, medicinal formulations of cocaine, and chloral hydrate.

The act also marks the beginning of the criminalization of addiction and the American black market for drugs. Within five years the Rainey Committee, a Special Committee on Investigation appointed by Secretary of the Treasury William Gibbs McAdoo and led by Congressman T. Rainey, reported in June, 1919 that drugs were being smuggled into the country by sea, and across the Mexican and Canadian borders by nationally established organisations and that the United States consumed 470,000 pounds of opium annually, compared to 17,000 pounds in both France and Germany. The Monthly Summary of Foreign Commerce of the United States recorded that in the 7 months to January 1920, 528,635 pounds of opium was imported, compared to 74,650 pounds in the same period in 1919.

Challenge 
The Act's applicability in prosecuting doctors who prescribe narcotics to addicts was successfully challenged in Linder v. United States in 1925, as Justice McReynolds ruled that the federal government has no power to regulate medical practice.

See also 
 Arguments for and against drug prohibition
 Prohibition of drugs

References

Further reading

External links 
 

1914 in law
1914 in the United States
History of drug control
United States federal controlled substances legislation
United States federal taxation legislation